This is a bibliography of the works of Paramahansa Yogananda, published by his worldwide spiritual organization Self-Realization Fellowship/Yogoda Satsanga Society of India. He began his spiritual work in India in 1917 and named it Yogoda Satsanga Society of India. When he came to the United States in 1920, he founded Self-Realization Fellowship. Today the international headquarters of Self-Realization Fellowship/Yogoda Satsanga Society of India is in Los Angeles, California.

Self-Realization Fellowship 
Yogananda's books published by Self-Realization Fellowship. The Autobiography of a Yogi has been in print since 1946.

1965 
 Prayers of a Master for His Disciples, Paramahansa Yogananda, Self-Realization Fellowship, 1965, paperback

1980s 
 Man’s Eternal Quest, Paramahansa Yogananda, Collected Talks and Essays on Realizing God in Daily Life, Volume I, Self-Realization Fellowship, 1982, paperback and hardback
 The Law of Success, Paramahansa Yogananda, Self-Realization Fellowship, 1982, paperback
 How You Can Talk With God, Paramahansa Yogananda, Self-Realization Fellowship, 1985, paperback
 Scientific Healing Affirmations, Paramahansa Yogananda, Self-Realization Fellowship, 1986, paperback and hardback
 The Science of Religion, Paramahansa Yogananda, Self-Realization Fellowship, 1986, paperback

1990s 
 Sayings of Paramahansa Yogananda, Paramahansa Yogananda, Self-Realization Fellowship, 1995, paperback and hardback
 Songs of the Soul, Paramahansa Yogananda, Self-Realization Fellowship, 1995, hardback
 The Second Coming of Christ, two volumes, Paramahansa Yogananda, Self-Realization Fellowship, 1996, paperback and hardback
 Wine of The Mystic, Paramahansa Yogananda, Self-Realization Fellowship, 1996, paperback
 In the Sanctuary of the Soul, Paramahansa Yogananda, Self-Realization Fellowship, 1998, hardback
 Two Frogs in Trouble, Fable, Paramahansa Yogananda, Self-Realization Fellowship, 1998, paperback
 Inner Peace, Paramahansa Yogananda, Self-Realization Fellowship, 1999, hardback

2000s 
 God Talks With Arjuna: The Bhagavad Gita, from Paramahansa Yogananda, Self-Realization Fellowship, 2002, paperback and hardback 
 To Be Victorious in Life, Paramahansa Yogananda, Self-Realization Fellowship, 2002, paperback
 Why God Permits Evil and How to Rise Above It, Paramahansa Yogananda, Self-Realization Fellowship, 2002, paperback
 Living Fearlessly, Paramahansa Yogananda, Self-Realization Fellowship, 2003, paperback
 Autobiography of a Yogi, Paramahansa Yogananda, Self-Realization Fellowship, 2004, paperback and hardback, available in fifty languages
 The Divine Romance, Paramahansa Yogananda Collected Talks and Essays on Realizing God in Daily Life, Volume II, Self-Realization Fellowship, 2004, paperback and hardback
  Spiritual Diary, Paramahansa Yogananda, Self Realization Fellowship, 2005, paperback
 Metaphysical Meditations, Paramahansa Yogananda, Self-Realization Fellowship, 2005, paperback and hardback 
 The Yoga of the Bhagavad Gita, compression from the two volumes of God Talks With Arjuna: The Bhagavad Gita, Paramahansa Yogananda, Self-Realization Fellowship, 2007, paperback
 The Yoga of Jesus, compression from the two volumes of The Second Coming of Christ, Paramahansa Yogananda, Self-Realization Fellowship, 2007, paperback
 Journey to Self-realization, Paramahansa Yogananda Collected Talks and Essays on Realizing God in Daily Life, Volume III, Self-Realization Fellowship, 2009, paperback and hardback
Whispers from Eternity, Paramahansa Yogananda, Self-Realization Fellowship, 2009, paperback and hardback
Answered Prayers, series of "How-to-Live" booklet, Paramahansa Yogananda, Self-Realization Fellowship, 2009, 
Focusing the Power of Attention for Success,  series of "How-to-Live" booklet, Paramahansa Yogananda, Self-Realization Fellowship, 2009, 
Harmonizing Physical, Mental, and Spiritual Methods of Healing,  series of "How-to-Live" booklet, Paramahansa Yogananda, Self-Realization Fellowship, 2009, 
Healing by God's Unlimited Power, series of "How-to-Live" booklet, Paramahansa Yogananda, Self-Realization Fellowship, 2009, 
How to Cultivate Divine Love, series of "How-to-Live" booklet, Paramahansa Yogananda, Self-Realization Fellowship, 2009, 
Remolding Your Life, series of "How-to-Live" booklet, Paramahansa Yogananda, Self-Realization Fellowship, 2009, 
Where Are Our Departed Loved Ones?, series of "How-to-Live" booklet, Paramahansa Yogananda, Self-Realization Fellowship, 2009, 
World Crisis, series of "How-to-Live" booklet, Paramahansa Yogananda, Self-Realization Fellowship, 2009,

2010s 
Where There Is Light, Paramahansa Yogananda, Self-Realization Fellowship, 2016, paperback and hardback

Yogoda Satsanga Society of India  
Yogananda's books published by Yogoda Satsanga Society of India. 

The Art of Living, Paramahansa Yogananda, Yogoda Satsanga Society, 2015, paperback
Developing Dynamic Will, Paramahansa Yogananda, Yogoda Satsanga Society, 2009, paperback
Increasing The Power of Initiative, Paramahansa Yogananda, Yogoda Satsanga Society, 2009, paperback
Habit - Your Master or Your Slave?, Paramahansa Yogananda, Yogoda Satsang Society, 2007, paperback
Man's Greatest Adventure, Paramahansa Yogananda, Yogoda Satsang Society, 2009, paperback
Nervousness: Cause and Cure, Paramahansa Yogananda, Yogoda Satsang Society, 2008, paperback
Seek God Now, Paramahansa Yogananda, Yogoda Satsang Society, 2009, paperback
Who Made God?, Paramahansa Yogananda, Yogoda Satsang Society, 2009, paperback
How to Find a Way to Victory, series of "How-to-Live" booklet, Paramahansa Yogananda, Yogoda Satsang Society, 2009, 
Ridding the Consciousness of Worry, series of "How-to-Live" booklet, Paramahansa Yogananda, Yogoda Satsang Society,

References 

Paramahansa Yogananda
Yogananda
Yogananda
Classic yoga books